The Whole Azerbaijan Popular Front Party, sometimes translated as the All-Azerbaijan Popular Front Party, is a political party in Azerbaijan. At the parliamentary election of 1 November 2015 the party won 1 out of 125 seats.

The PFPWA was a member of the European Conservatives and Reformists Party (until 2022).

References

2004 establishments in Azerbaijan
Conservative parties in Azerbaijan
Political parties established in 2004
Political parties in Azerbaijan
Azerbaijani democracy movements